Woodsboro may refer to a place in the United States:

 Woodsboro, Maryland
 Woodsboro, Texas
 Woodsboro, California, a fictional town where multiple films in the Scream horror movie franchise are set.